Mary Wade Correctional Centre is a maximum-security prison for women in suburban Sydney, Australia, operated by Corrective Services NSW, an agency of the New South Wales state government. The prison houses female inmates on remand. The centre was named for Mary Wade, a convict transported to colonial NSW in 1790.

The site, on Joseph Street in the suburb of Lidcombe, was previously home to the Minda and later Juniperina juvenile detention centres. In 2016, the site was transferred to Corrective Services and converted to a remand prison for women, reducing pressure on the existing Silverwater Women's Correctional Centre.

Mary Wade Correctional Centre has a capacity of 94.

See also 
 Mary Wade

References 

2017 establishments in Australia
Prisons in Sydney
Lidcombe, New South Wales